The Heritage Foundation (abbreviated to Heritage) is an American conservative think tank based in Washington, D.C. that is primarily geared toward public policy. The foundation took a leading role in the conservative movement during the presidency of Ronald Reagan, whose policies were taken from Heritage's policy study Mandate for Leadership.

The Heritage Foundation has had significant influence in U.S. public policy making. It is among the most influential public policy organizations in the United States.

History and major initiatives

Early years

The Heritage Foundation was founded on February 16, 1973, by Paul Weyrich, Edwin Feulner, J. F. Rench and Joseph Coors. Growing out of the new business activist movement inspired by the Powell Memorandum, discontent with Richard Nixon's embrace of the "liberal consensus" and the nonpolemical, cautious nature of existing think tanks, Weyrich and Feulner sought to create a version of the Brookings Institution that advanced conservative activism. Coors was the primary funder of the Heritage Foundation in its early years. Weyrich was its first president. Later, under president Frank J. Walton, the Heritage Foundation began using direct mail fundraising and Heritage's annual income grew to $1 million per year in 1976. By 1981, the annual budget grew to $5.3 million.

Heritage advocated for pro-business policies, anti-communism and neoconservatism in its early years, but distinguished itself from the conservative American Enterprise Institute (AEI) by also advocating for the Christian right. Through the 1970s, Heritage would remain small relative to Brookings and the AEI.

Reagan administration
In January 1981, Heritage published the Mandate for Leadership, a comprehensive report aimed at reducing the size of the federal government, providing public policy guidance to the incoming Reagan administration, including more than 2,000 specific suggestions to move the federal government in a conservative direction. The report was well received by the White House, and several of its authors went on to take positions in the Reagan administration. Reagan liked the ideas so much that he gave a copy to each member of his cabinet to review. Approximately 60% of the 2,000 proposals were implemented or initiated by the end of Reagan's first year in office. Ronald Reagan later said that the Heritage Foundation was a "vital force" in the successes during his presidency.

Heritage was influential in developing and advancing of the so-called "Reagan Doctrine", a Reagan administration foreign policy initiative in which the U.S. provided military and other support to anti-communist resistance movements fighting Soviet-aligned governments in Afghanistan, Angola, Cambodia, Nicaragua and other nations during the final years of the Cold War.

Heritage also advocated the development of new ballistic missile defense systems for the United States. Reagan adopted this as his top defense priority in 1983, calling it the Strategic Defense Initiative. By mid-decade, The Heritage Foundation had emerged as a key organization in the national conservative movement, publishing influential reports on domestic and defense issues, as well as pieces by prominent conservative figures, such as Bob Dole and Pat Robertson. In 1986, Time magazine called Heritage "the foremost of the new breed of advocacy tanks". During the Reagan and Bush administrations, The Heritage Foundation served as the President's brain trust on foreign policy.

George H. W. Bush administration
The Heritage Foundation remained an influential voice on domestic and foreign policy issues during President George H. W. Bush's administration. It was a leading proponent of Operation Desert Storm against Iraq, and – according to Frank Starr, head of the Baltimore Suns Washington bureau – the foundation's studies "laid much of the groundwork for Bush administration thinking" about post-Soviet foreign policy. In domestic policy, the Bush administration agreed with six of the ten budget reforms contained in Mandate for Leadership III and included them in their 1990 budget proposal. Heritage also became involved in the culture wars of the 1990s with the publication of "The Index of Leading Cultural Indicators" by William Bennett. The Index documented how crime, illegitimacy, divorce, teenage suicide, drug use and fourteen other social indicators had become measurably worse since the 1960s.

Clinton administration
Heritage continued to grow throughout the 1990s and its journal, Policy Review, hit an all-time-high circulation of 23,000. Heritage was an opponent of the Clinton health care plan of 1993. President Clinton's welfare reforms were analogous with Heritage's recommendations and were adopted in the Personal Responsibility and Work Opportunity Act of 1996. In 1995, Heritage published the first Index of Economic Freedom, co-authored by policy analyst Bryan T. Johnson and Thomas P. Sheehy. In 1997, the Index became a joint project between the Heritage Foundation and The Wall Street Journal.

In 1994, Heritage advised Newt Gingrich and other conservatives on the development of the "Contract with America", which was credited with helping to produce a Republican majority in Congress. The "Contract" was a pact of principles that directly challenged both the political status-quo in Washington and many of the ideas at the heart of the Clinton administration.

George W. Bush administration
The Heritage Foundation supported the wars in Afghanistan and Iraq. According to a 2004 study in the journal International Security, the Heritage Foundation confused public debate by challenging widespread opposition to the Iraq War by international relations scholars and experts by contradicting them "with experts of apparently equal authority... this undermined the possibility that any criticisms [of the war] might be seen as authoritative or have much persuasive effect." The organization defended the Bush administration's Guantanamo Bay practices.

In 2005, The Washington Post criticized the Heritage Foundation for softening its criticism of Malaysia following a business relationship between Heritage's president and Malaysia's prime minister Mahathir Mohamad. The Heritage Foundation denied any conflict of interest, stating its views on Malaysia changed following the country's cooperation with the U.S. after the September 11 attacks in 2001, and changes by Malaysia "moving in the right economic and political direction."

Obama administration

The health insurance mandate in the 2010 Patient Protection and Affordable Care Act, also known as Obamacare, is an idea hatched in 1989 by Stuart Butler at Heritage in a publication titled "Assuring Affordable Health Care for All Americans". This was also the model for Mitt Romney's health care plan in Massachusetts.

In December 2012, an announcement was made that Senator Jim DeMint would resign from the Senate to head the Heritage Foundation. Pundits predicted his tenure would bring a sharper, more politicized edge to the foundation. DeMint's eventual ouster in 2017 led some, such as Mickey Edwards (R-Okla.), to believe Heritage sought to pare back its partisan edge and restore its reputation as a pioneering think tank.

On May 10, 2013, Jason Richwine, who co-authored the think tank's controversial report on the costs of amnesty, resigned his position following intensive media attention on his Harvard PhD thesis from 2009 and comments he made at a 2008 American Enterprise Institute forum. Richwine argued that Hispanics and Blacks are intellectually inferior to Whites and have trouble assimilating because of a supposed genetic predisposition to lower IQ.

A 2011 study on poverty in America was criticized for what critics called an overly narrow definition of poverty. Criticism was published in opinion editorials in The New Republic, The Nation, the Center for American Progress, and The Washington Post.

A 2013 study by Heritage senior fellow Robert Rector on the 2013 Senate Immigration Bill (Border Security, Economic Opportunity, and Immigration Modernization Act of 2013) was criticized for its methodology by critics from across the political spectrum. Notably, outlets like Reason magazine and the Cato Institute criticized the report for failing to employ dynamic scoring despite Heritage's support for such methodology in analyzing other policy proposals. The study was also criticized because its co-author, Jason Richwine, said in his 2009 doctoral dissertation that immigrants' IQs should be considered when crafting public policy.

In July 2013, following disputes over the farm bill, the Republican Study Committee of 172 conservative U.S. House members reversed a decades-old tradition of access by barring Heritage Foundation employees from attending its weekly meeting in the Capitol, but continues cooperation through "regular joint events and briefings".

In September 2015, the foundation stated publicly that it had been targeted by hackers and had experienced a breach in which donors' information was taken. The Hill publication compared the attack to another notable data breach at the Office of Personnel Management a few months before. The identity of those that attacked the foundation and their motivations are unknown.

Trump administration
The Heritage Foundation had a major influence on Donald Trump's presidential transition and administration. The foundation had a powerful say in the staffing of the administration, with CNN noting during the transition that "no other Washington institution has that kind of footprint in the transition." One reason for the Heritage Foundation's disproportionate influence relative to other conservative think tanks is that other conservative think tanks had members who identified as "never-Trumpers" during the 2016 election whereas the Heritage Foundation signaled early on to Trump that it would be supportive of him. At least 66 foundation employees and alumni were given positions in the administration.

In 2014, the Heritage Foundation began building a database of approximately 3,000 conservatives who they trusted to serve in a hypothetical Republican administration for the upcoming 2016 election. According to individuals involved in crafting the database, several hundred people from the Heritage database ultimately received jobs in government agencies, including Scott Pruitt, Betsy DeVos, Mick Mulvaney, Rick Perry, Jeff Sessions and others who became members of Trump's cabinet.  Jim DeMint, president of the Heritage Foundation from 2013 to 2017, personally intervened on behalf of Mulvaney who would go on to head the Office of Management and Budget, the Consumer Financial Protection Bureau, and later become acting White House Chief of Staff.

In 2021, after Trump lost re-election, the Heritage Foundation hired Chad Wolf, Ken Cuccinelli and Mark Morgan, all three of whom played a prominent role in the immigration policies of the Trump administration. It also hired former Vice President Mike Pence. Shortly thereafter, Pence published an op-ed on a Heritage Foundation website which made false claims of fraud in the 2020 election, as well as numerous false claims about For the People Act, a Democratic bill to expand voting rights.

Biden administration 
In 2021, the Heritage Foundation shifted from its traditional style of conservatism to firebrand, Trump-style conservatism. Right-wing figures and Trump allies frequently criticized Heritage Foundation positions under the leadership of Kay Coles James in 2020 and 2021, prompting her to step down in March. She was replaced by Kevin Roberts, the head of the Texas Public Policy Foundation and member of Texas Governor Greg Abbott's COVID-19 task force.

Activities
The Heritage Foundation has been considered one of the world's most influential think tanks. The 2020 Global Go To Think Tank Index Report ranks Heritage as sixth among the "top ten think tanks in the United States" and thirteenth worldwide.

Heritage published a 1981 book of policy analyses, Mandate for Leadership, that  offered specific recommendations on policy, budget, and administrative action for all Cabinet departments. The Heritage Foundation also publishes The Insider, a quarterly magazine about public policy. Until 2001, the Heritage Foundation published Policy Review, a public policy journal; the journal was then acquired by the Hoover Institution. From 1995 to 2005, the Heritage Foundation ran Townhall.com, a conservative website that was subsequently acquired by Camarillo, California-based Salem Communications.

Under Jim DeMint's leadership, the process involved in publishing policy papers changed at the Heritage Foundation. Whereas previous senior staff reviewed policy papers by authors, DeMint and his team heavily edited policy papers or shelved them. In response to this, several scholars at the foundation quit.

Internationally, Heritage publishes the annual Index of Economic Freedom, which measures a country's freedom in terms of property rights and freedom from government regulation. The factors used to calculate the Index score are corruption in government, barriers to international trade, income tax and corporate tax rates, government expenditures, rule of law and the ability to enforce contracts, regulatory burdens, banking restrictions, labor regulations, and black market activities. A British-born academic, Charles W. L. Hill, after discussing the international shift toward a market-based economic system and Heritage Foundation's Index of Economic Freedom, said "given that the Heritage Foundation has a political agenda, its work should be viewed with caution."

In 2002, Heritage began publishing its annual "Index of Dependence" report on federal government programs in five areas (housing; health care and welfare; retirement; higher education; and rural and agricultural services) that, in its view, constrain private sector or local government alternatives and impact the dependence of individuals on the federal government. The 2010 Heritage report concluded that each year the number of Americans who pay nothing in federal personal income taxes had increased, while the number who rely on government services increased. The 2010 report stated that in the previous eight years, the index of government dependence has grown by almost 33 percent. Heritage's conclusions have been questioned; Rex Nutting of MarketWatch wrote in 2012 that the report was "misleading" and "alarmist"; that the percentage of Americans "dependent" upon government had remained essentially the same as it was in the 1980s; and that a small increase was attributable to the Great Recession and an aging population with proportionally more retirees.

The Heritage Foundation's blog, The Foundry, was phased out in 2014 and replaced with The Daily Signal.

In 2005, Heritage established the Margaret Thatcher Center for Freedom in honor of the former British prime minister. Thatcher herself maintained a long relationship with The Heritage Foundation. Shortly after leaving office, Thatcher was honored by Heritage at a September 1991 dinner. Seven years later, Thatcher delivered the keynote address during Heritage's 25th anniversary celebration. In 2002, Thatcher was again honored by Heritage as the recipient of its annual Clare Boothe Luce Award.

In November 2011, the Heritage Foundation and the American Enterprise Institute (AEI) co-hosted a debate among the candidates for the 2012 Republican presidential nomination on foreign policy and national defense. The first presidential debate to be sponsored by either Heritage or AEI, During the debate, Heritage fellows Edwin Meese and David Addington were among the moderators. Conservative commentator Michael Barone praised the debate as "probably the most substantive and serious presidential debate of this election cycle."

The Heritage Foundation is an associate member of the State Policy Network.

Climate change denial 
The Heritage Foundation rejects the scientific consensus on climate change. The Heritage Foundation is one of many climate change denial organizations that have been funded by ExxonMobil. The Heritage Foundation strongly criticized the Kyoto Agreement to curb climate change, saying American participation in the treaty would "result in lower economic growth in every state and nearly every sector of the economy." They projected that the 2009 cap-and-trade bill, the American Clean Energy and Security Act, would result in a cost of $1,870 per family in 2025 and $6,800 by 2035; on the other hand, the non-partisan Congressional Budget Office projected that it would only cost the average family $175 in 2020.

Voter fraud claims
The Heritage Foundation has promoted false claims of voter fraud. Hans von Spakovsky who heads the Election Law Reform Initiative at the Heritage Foundation has played an influential role in making alarmism about voter fraud mainstream in the Republican Party, despite no evidence of widespread voter fraud. His work, which claims voting fraud is rampant, has been discredited.

Following the 2020 presidential election—in which President Donald Trump made baseless claims of fraud after he was defeated for reelection—the Heritage Foundation launched a campaign in support of Republican efforts to make state voting laws more restrictive. Heritage, through its political arm, Heritage Action for America, planned to spend $24 million over two years across eight key states to support efforts to restrict voting, in coordination with the Republican Party and allied conservative outside groups, such as Susan B. Anthony List, American Legislative Exchange Council and State Policy Network. Almost two dozen election bills introduced by Republican state legislators in early 2021 were based on a Heritage letter and report. Heritage also mobilized in opposition to H.R. 1./S. 1, a Democratic bill to establish uniform nationwide voting standards (including expanded early and postal voting, as well as automatic and same-day voter registration), reform campaign finance law, and prohibit partisan redistricting. In 2021, Heritage Action spent $750,000 on television ads in Arizona to promote the false claim that "Democrats ... want to register illegal aliens" to vote, even though the Democrats' legislation creates safeguards to ensure that ineligible people cannot register. In April 2021, Heritage Action boasted to its private donors that it had successfully crafted the election reform bills that Republican state legislators introduced in Georgia and other states.

Anti-critical race theory legislation 
In 2021, the Heritage Foundation said that one of its two priorities (along with tightening voting laws) was to push Republican-controlled states to ban or restrict critical race theory instruction. The Heritage Foundation sought to get Republicans in Congress to put anti-critical race theory provisions into must-pass legislation such as the annual defense spending bill.

Opposition to transgender rights 
The Heritage Foundation has engaged in several activities in opposition to transgender rights, including hosting several anti-transgender rights events, developing and supporting legislation templates against transgender rights, and making claims about transgender youth healthcare and suicide rates based on internal research, contrary to the findings of peer-reviewed scientific studies.

Ukraine 
Heritage Action opposed the $40 billion military aid package for Ukraine passed in May 2022 after the Russian invasion of Ukraine, breaking from its previous positions of support for such aid. The Heritage Foundation's foreign policy director at the time, Luke Coffey, said he was ordered to retract his earlier statements supporting aid to Ukraine. Coffey subsequently left the Heritage Foundation.

Funding
In 1973, businessman Joseph Coors contributed $250,000 to establish The Heritage Foundation and continued to fund it through the Adolph Coors Foundation. In 1973, it had trustees from Chase Manhattan Bank, Dow Chemical, General Motors, Pfizer, Sears and Mobil.

In the 1980s, The Heritage Foundation reportedly received a $2.2 million donation from South Korea's National Intelligence Service, then known as the Korean Central Intelligence Agency.

Heritage is a tax-exempt 501(c)(3) organization as well as a BBB Wise Giving Alliance accredited charity funded by donations from private individuals, corporations and charitable foundations. As a 501(c)(3), Heritage is not required to disclose its donors and donations to the foundation are tax-deductible.  Heritage is a grantee of the Donors Trust, a nonprofit donor-advised fund. As of 2010, Heritage reported 710,000 supporters.

For the fiscal year ending December 31, 2011, Charity Watch reported that Edwin Feulner, past president of The Heritage Foundation, received the highest compensation in its top 25 list of compensation received by charity members. According to Charity Watch, Feulner received $2,702,687 in 2013. This sum includes investment earnings of $1,656,230 accrued over a period of 33 years.

Heritage's total revenue for 2011 was $72,170,983 and its expenses were $80,033,828.

Notable board of trustees members
 Larry P. Arnn, Trustee since 2002; President of Hillsdale College.
 Jim DeMint, Former President and board member; former United States Senator.
 Edwin J. Feulner, Trustee since 1973; President of the Heritage Foundation.
 Steve Forbes, Trustee since 2001; President and CEO of Forbes.
 Jerry Hume, Trustee since 1993; Chairman of Basic American Foods.
 Kay Coles James, Former President since 2021 and Trustee since 2005; former Director of the United States Office of Personnel Management.
 Edwin Meese, III, former Attorney General of the United States
 Rebekah Mercer, Trustee since 2014; Director of the Mercer Family Foundation.
 J. William Middendorf, Trustee since 1989; American politician.
 Anthony Saliba, Trustee since 2012; trader, entrepreneur, and author.
 Thomas A. Saunders III, Trustee since 2005; founder of Saunders Karp & Megrue.
 Brian Tracy, Trustee since 2003; motivational public speaker and self-development author.

Honorary and emeritus board members
 Midge Decter, Trustee from 1981 to 2015 and Society of Emeritus Trustees since 2015; journalist.
 Frank Shakespeare, Honorary Trustee since 1979; United States Ambassador to the Vatican (1986–1989).
 William E. Simon, Jr.; Politician and banker.

References

External links

 
 
 

 
1973 establishments in the United States
Advocacy groups in the United States
Anti-communist organizations in the United States
Climate change denial
Conservative organizations in the United States
Foreign policy and strategy think tanks in the United States
New Right (United States)
Non-profit organizations based in Washington, D.C.
Organizations of environmentalism skeptics and critics
Organizations that oppose LGBT rights in the United States
Political and economic think tanks in the United States
Think tanks based in Washington, D.C.
Think tanks established in 1973